A quilter is someone who practices the art of quilting.

Quilter may also refer to

People
David Quilter (born 1942), British actor
Laura Quilter  (born 1968), American writer, lawyer, and archivist
Peter Quilter (fl. 1998–2019), British playwright
Roger Quilter (1877–1953), British composer

Other uses
Quilter baronets, a title in the Baronetage of the United Kingdom
Quilter Cup, a rugby union trophy, United Kingdom
Quilter Labs, American guitar amplifier manufacturer
Quilter plc, British financial services company

Occupational surnames
English-language occupational surnames